Jing'an County is a county in the northwest of Jiangxi province, People's Republic of China. It is under the jurisdiction of the prefecture-level city of Yichun.

Administrative divisions
Jing'an County has 5 towns and 6 townships. 
5 towns

6 townships

Demographics 

Climate

Notes and references

External links
  Government site - 

 
County-level divisions of Jiangxi